Palmaris brevis muscle is a thin, quadrilateral muscle, placed beneath the integument of the ulnar side of the hand. It acts to fold the skin of the hypothenar eminence transversally.

Structure

Origin and insertion
Palmaris brevis muscle is located on the ulnar side of the hand. It arises from the tendinous fasciculi from the transverse carpal ligament and palmar aponeurosis. The muscle fibres are inserted into the skin on the ulnar border of the palm of the hand, and occasionally on the pisiform bone.

Innervation
Palmaris brevis muscle is the only muscle innervated by the superficial branch of the ulnar nerve (C8, T1).

Blood supply
Palmaris brevis muscle is supplied by the palmar metacarpal artery of the deep palmar arch.

Discovery 
The first recorded observation of the muscle is by Italian anatomist Giambattista Canano sometime before 1543. The muscle was independently discovered a few years later by Realdo Colombo before being pushed to general acceptance in the works of Andreas Vesalius.

Function 
Palmaris brevis muscle tenses the skin of the palm on the ulnar side during a grip action. It also deepens the hollow of the palm. The palmaris brevis may protect the ulnar nerve and ulnar artery from compressive forces during repetitive grasping actions. The muscle has a fatigue-resistant fiber type profile, which supports the idea of a protective function to the ulnar neurovasculature during repetitive intermittent grasping tasks.

See also 
 Thenar eminence
 Palmar interossei muscles
 Palmaris longus muscle

Additional images

References

Muscles of the upper limb